University spin-offs (also known as university spin-outs) are companies that transform technological inventions developed from university research that are likely to remain unexploited otherwise.  They are a subcategory of research spin-offs. Prominent examples of university spin-offs are Genentech, Crucell, Lycos and Plastic Logic. In most countries, universities can claim the intellectual property (IP) rights on technologies developed in their laboratories. In the United States, the Bayh–Dole Act permits universities to pursue ownership of inventions made by researchers at their institutions using funding from the federal government, where previously federal research funding contracts and grants obligated inventors (wherever they worked) to assign the resulting IP to the government. This IP typically draws on patents or, in exceptional cases, copyrights. Therefore, the process of establishing the spin-off as a new corporation involves transferring the IP to the new corporation or giving the latter a license on this IP. Most research universities now have Technology Licensing Offices (TLOs) to facilitate and pursue such opportunities.

Critical steps in developing a spin-off 

University spin-offs typically go through a number of critical steps to develop the initial invention into a successful business venture. The following steps are critical in creating a successful spin-off (not necessarily in this order).

 Developing a successful Business Model Canvas for the spin-off; a business model depicts the rationale of how the spin-off will create, deliver and capture value.
 Acquiring the first customers. The first customer, also called an early adopter, can provide candid feedback to help the spin-off refine future product releases and also provide access to a distribution channel or other forms of support.
 Developing a proof of concept, or proof of principle, that demonstrates that the invented method or new theory is probably useful in a particular application - for example a new product.
 Developing a fully functioning prototype of this new product; the prototype also serves to learn about how to produce, use and sell the new product.
 Attracting startup funding to finance the development of prototypes and new products; this may involve acquiring financial resources from venture capital firms, angel Investors, banks, or other providers of early-stage financial capital.

See Small Business Innovation Research for associated spin-off funding opportunities.

Conditions for spin-off creation 

Some universities generate substantially higher numbers of spin-offs than others. Universities with high numbers of successful spin-offs:
 draw on university-wide awareness of entrepreneurial opportunities and/or benefit from a strong entrepreneurship culture at the national or regional level;
 have developed a university culture that thrives on entrepreneurial role models among their alumni and academic staff as well as successful spin-offs that serve as inspiring examples (e.g. Lycos at Carnegie Mellon University);
 actively stimulate the development of entrepreneurial talent and help founders of spin-offs obtain access to investors, consultants and other forms of support; these activities are particularly critical in (e.g. continental European) countries that suffer from an entrepreneurial culture that is weaker than elsewhere (e.g. USA).

Other issues 

University spin-off activity may give rise to potential conflicts of interest between commercial and academic work. In addition, the university's reputation may be at risk if founders of spin-offs act inappropriately.  Moreover, the antagonism between academic research and technology commercialization by way of spin-offs is likely to create fairness issues, for example regarding the distribution of royalties or equity. This antagonism can be managed by installing transparent procedures for the spin-off formation process that enhance fair treatment of all participants.

Examples of university spin-offs
Crucell
Genentech
Locus Biosciences
Lycos
Plastic Logic
Google

See also
Angel investor
Entrepreneurship
Intellectual property
Proof of concept
Research spin-off
Spin-off (disambiguation)
Venture capital

References

Further reading

 Bird, B., Hayward, D.J., and Allen, D.N. (1993). Conflicts in the Commercialization of Knowledge: Perspectives from Science and Entrepreneurship. Entrepreneurship Theory and Practice, vol. 17(4): 57–79.
 Clarysse, B., Wright, M., Lockett, A., Van de Velde, E., and Vohora, A. (2005). Spinning Out New Ventures: A Typology of Incubation Strategies from European Research Institutions. Journal of Business Venturing, vol. 20(2):183–216.
 Di Gregorio, D. and Shane, S. (2003). Why Do Some Universities Generate More Start-Ups than Others? Research Policy, vol. 32(2): 209–227.
 Klofsten, M. and Jones-Evans, D. (2000). Comparing Academic Entrepreneurship in Europe - The Case of Sweden and Ireland. Small Business Economics, vol. 14: 299–309.
 Kondo, M. (2004). University Spinoffs in Japan: From University–Industry Collaboration to University–Industry Crossover. Report by National Institute of Science and Technology Policy (NISTEP). Tokyo: Yokohama National University.
 Lindelöf, P., (2011), Formal institutional contexts as ownership of intellectual property rights and their implications for the organization of commercialization of innovations at Universities – Comparative data from Sweden and the United Kingdom International Journal of Innovation Management, 15(5), 1069-1092
Oliveira, M.A., Ferreira, J.J.P., Xavier, A., de Sousa, J.C.C.P., Meireles, G., Sousa, M., Tomperi, S., Torkkeli, M., Salmi, P., Tolsma, A., Ye, Q., Tzmrielak, D., van Geenhuizen, M. (2012). Spin-Up – Creating an entrepreneurship coaching and training program for university spin-offs.. http://www.spin-up.eu
 Shane, S. (2004). Academic Entrepreneurship: University Spinoffs and Wealth Creation. Cheltenham, UK: Edward Elgar.
 Slaughter, S. and Rhoades, G. (2004). Academic Capitalism and the New Economy. Baltimore: Johns Hopkins University Press.
 Van Burg, E., Romme, A.G.L., Gilsing, V.A. and Reymen, I.M.M.J. (2008), Creating University Spinoffs: A Science-Based Design Perspective. Journal of Product Innovation Management, vol. 25: 114–128.
 Vohora, A., Wright, M., and Lockett, A. (2004). Critical Junctures in the Development of University High-Tech Spinout Companies. Research Policy, vol. 33(1):147–175.
 Wright, M., Clarysse, B., Mustar, P., and Lockett, A. (2007). Academic Entrepreneurship in Europe. Cheltenham, UK: Edward Elgar.

Entrepreneurship
Research